Osama Maukhlif Tawfiq al-Tikriti is a former leader of the Iraqi Islamic Party, a Sunni Arab religious party which was the largest Sunni Arab led party in the Iraqi legislative election of December 2005. He succeeded Tariq al-Hashimi, Vice President of Iraq, as leader of the IIP when al-Hashimi left the party to form the Renewal List. Tikriti took over as Secretary General of the IIP on 24 May 2009. Ayad al-Samarrai was elected as his Deputy.

He was a member of the Council of Representatives of Iraq from Baghdad Governorate. He is a member of the CoR's Committee on Foreign Affairs.

Tikriti's son, Anas, is the former head of the Muslim Association of Britain.

External links
 Iraqi Islamic Party (IIP) (Arabic only)
 Iraqi Council of Representatives (CoR) (English page)

References

1939 births
Living people
Alumni of the University of London
Iraqi Islamic Party politicians
Members of the Council of Representatives of Iraq
Iraqi Sunni Muslims
Sunni Islamists